The 2007–08 Algerian Championnat National was the 46th season of the Algerian Championnat National since its establishment in 1962. A total of 16 teams contested the league, with ES Sétif as the defending champions.

Team summaries

Promotion and relegation 
Teams promoted from Algerian Division 2 2007-2008 
 MC El Eulma
 MSP Batna
 USM El Harrach
 RC Kouba1

1 after the decision of the TAS RC Kouba was promoted to 2008–09 Algerian Championnat National.

Teams relegated to Algerian Division 2 2008-2009
 MC Oran
 OMR El Annasser
 WA Tlemcen

League table

Season statistics

Top scorers

References

External links
2007–08 Algerian Championnat National

Algerian Ligue Professionnelle 1 seasons
1
Algeria